Shahrak-e Miheh (also Romanized as Shahrak-e Mīheh; also known as Meyheh-ye ‘Olyā) is a village in Tang-e-Gazi Rural District, in the Central District of Kuhrang County, Chaharmahal and Bakhtiari Province, Iran. At the 2006 census, its population was 822, in 161 families. The village is populated by Lurs.

References 

Populated places in Kuhrang County
Luri settlements in Chaharmahal and Bakhtiari Province